Júlia Melo Gomes (born 10 March 2002) is a Brazilian singer and actress. She become nationally known after winning the second season of the talent show Qual é o Seu Talento?.

Qual é o Seu Talento?

Júlia Gomes auditioned on Qual é o Seu Talento? 2 in late-2009 and then advanced to the São Paulo Round, where she sang "Carinhoso" by Marisa Monte. She then advanced to the semi-finals, singing "Ben" by Michael Jackson.

During the finals, she sang "I Will Always Love You" by Whitney Houston. Júlia was praised by all the judges, who said the version of the song was beautiful and the girl knocked the other contestants, such as Laura Fontana, the Baby Lady Gaga.

In the end, she came out as the winner, while lyrical singer Danillu and acrobatic gymnastics Guaru ESD were the runners-up.

Performances

Post Qual é o Seu Talento?

After finishing as the winner, she attended several SBT shows. With the R$200,000 prize, Júlia will take a trip to Disney World, buy a piano, and invest in her singing career.

References

External links
 

2002 births
Living people
Actresses from São Paulo
21st-century Brazilian women singers
21st-century Brazilian singers
Reality show winners
Qual é o Seu Talento?
Singers from São Paulo